Martins Tagebuch is an East German film. It was released in 1955.

External links
 

1955 films
East German films
1950s German-language films
German black-and-white films
1950s German films